Mehranrud Rural District is in the Central District of Tabriz County, East Azerbaijan province, Iran. It was established in the Central District from parts of Esperan Rural District in 2021. Meydan Chay Rural District and the city of Basmenj were separated from the Central District to establish Basmenj District, of which Mehranrud was to have been a part. Opposition to its inclusion in Basmenj led to the retention of the rural district within the Central District.

References 

Tabriz County

Rural Districts of East Azerbaijan Province

Populated places in East Azerbaijan Province

Populated places in Tabriz County

fa:دهستان مهران‌رود